
Gmina Krynica-Zdrój is an urban-rural gmina (administrative district) in Nowy Sącz County, Lesser Poland Voivodeship, in southern Poland, on the Slovak border.

Villages
Apart from the town of Krynica-Zdrój, Gmina Krynica-Zdrój contains the villages and settlements of Berest, Czyrna, Mochnaczka Niżna, Mochnaczka Wyżna, Muszynka, Piorunka, Polany and Tylicz.

Neighbouring gminas
Gmina Krynica-Zdrój is bordered by the gminas of Grybów, Łabowa, Muszyna and Uście Gorlickie. It also borders Slovakia.

References
Polish official population figures 2006

Krynica-Zdroj
Gmina Krynica Zdroj